TAI Pelikan, aka IHA-X2, is a radio-controlled reconnaissance, surveillance and target acquisition drone. Designed, developed and built by Turkish Aerospace Industries (TAI), the unmanned aerial vehicle (UAV) is a half scale model of the tactical drone TAI Baykuş air platform.
It was produced as a training and bridge platform to the TAI Baykuş.

Pelikan is the Turkish word for species pelican. TAI has some other UAV's named after birds.

Development
The shoulder-winged UAV has all composite material airframe with metal twin tail booms. The drone is propelled by two 2-cylinder 2-stroke gasoline engines of type Zenoah G38 from Japan with 4 x  power. There exist two versions of TAI Pelikan related to propeller configuration, a pusher and a tractor aircraft. The drone carries a two-axis gimbaled EO/IR camera, which relays its video in real-time telemetry. Its guidance/tracking takes place fully autonomous based on INS/GPS integrated waypoint navigation system. Take off and landing of the drone is accomplished in conventional way on wheels.

Specifications

References

External links
 TAI Pelikan images at Defence Talk website

Unmanned aerial vehicles of Turkey
Unmanned military aircraft of Turkey
Turkish military reconnaissance aircraft
Pelikan
Twin-engined push-pull aircraft
High-wing aircraft
Twin-boom aircraft